Carcedo may refer to:

People
Juan Carlos Carcedo, Spanish footballer
María Luisa Carcedo, Spanish politician

Places
Carcedo de Bureba
Carcedo de Burgos